Ford Thompson Dabney (15 March 1883 – 6 June 1958) was an American ragtime pianist, composer, songwriter, and acclaimed director of bands and orchestras for Broadway musical theater, revues, vaudeville, and early recordings. Additionally, for two years in Washington, from 1910 to 1912, he was proprietor of a theater that featured vaudeville, musical revues, and silent film. Dabney is best known as composer and lyricist of the 1910 song "That's Why They Call Me Shine," which for  decades, through , has endured as a jazz standard. As of 2020, in the jazz genre, "Shine" has been recorded 646 times Dabney and one of his chief collaborators, James Reese Europe (1880–1919), were transitional figures in the prehistory of jazz that evolved from ragtime (which loosely includes some syncopated music) and blues — and grew into stride, boogie-woogie, and other next levels in jazz. Their 1914 composition, "Castle Walk" – recorded February 10, 1914, by Europe's Society Orchestra with Dabney at the piano (Victor 17553-A, Matrix: B-14434) – is one of the earliest recordings of jazz.

Career

Education 
Dabney attended the business education division of Colored High School (aka M Street High School) in Washington, D.C., grades nine through eleven. Robert Heberton Terrell was the Principal. On June 22, 1901, Dabney was promoted from 1st year (grade 9) to 2nd (grade 10) for the fall of 1901. This was the same school that James Reese Europe graduated from in 1902. Dabney then attended Armstrong Manual Training School in Washington. He sang in the church choir of St. Mary's Protestant Episcopal Chapel – a mission of St. John's Parish – 23rd Street, between G and H Streets, N.W. – the current campus of George Washington University.

Dabney studied music privately first with his father, John Wendell Dabney, then with his uncle, Wendell Phillips Dabney (1865-1952), then Charles Donch (né Charles Bernard Donch; 1858–1948), William Waldecker (1857–1931), an organist for several churches in Washington, and Samuel Fabian (né Samuel Monroe Fabian; 1859–1921), a concert pianist.

1901: New York 
Dabney moved from Washington, D.C., to New York around 1901, two or three years before James Reese Europe moved there. In New York, Dabney studied music and played piano in parlors. He played many piano engagements in drawing rooms filled to capacity with prominent society. Dabney and Europe's early days in New York apparently overlapped because, reportedly, they often met at the Marshall Hotel in Midtown's Tenderloin District, at 127–129 West 53rd Street, between Sixth and Seventh Avenues – one of two avant-garde hotels for creative, intellectual black New Yorkers. James L. Marshall (1874–1925), with the assistance of his brother, George Marshall – both accomplished African-American bonifaces – operated the hotel from 1901 through 1914. The Colored Vaudeville Benevolent Association (compare to White Rats of America), when founded in 1909, was headquartered right across the street at 320 West 53rd Street. The Clef Club – founded in 1910 by Europe, Dabney, and others – was initially headquartered next door, at 137 West 53rd Street, but eventually moved west two blocks to 334 West 53rd. St. Mark's M.E. Church, an African-American congregation, was one block east, at 231 West 53rd. The church flourished from 1895 to 1926.

That same neighborhood, one block south — 52nd Street, between 6th and 7th Avenues — contained, from the late 1930s until the early 1960s, a remarkable concentration of jazz night clubs.

Haiti 
While in New York, Dabney won sponsorship of the Haitian consul to France, Joseph Jefford, who also was a special Haitian envoy to the United States. In the first week of January 1904, he sailed to Haiti to fill a four-month post as pianist to the president, Pierre Nord Alexis (1820–1910), for $4,000. His itinerary included a trip to France to play for President Émile Loubet, then to Germany. His appointment in Haiti was extended through 1907.

Dabney's Theater, Washington, D.C. 
From around October 1910 through 1911, Dabney owned and operated a theater bearing his name, "Ford Dabney's Theater." It was located at the eastern edge of the Cardozo neighborhood, Washington, D.C., on the northeast corner of 9th and U Streets, N.W. (2001 9th Street, N.W.), around the corner from the current African American Civil War Memorial Museum. George W. Hamilton (1871–1910) was general manager. The theater's tagline in newspaper ads read, "Refined vaudeville and motion pictures."

In 1910, Dabney formed several touring vaudeville groups, among which, he and violinist Willie Carroll (né William Thomas Carroll; 1881–1943) conceived and produced Dabney's Ginger Girls, who first performed at his theater before going on the road. The Ginger girls were a duet: Lottie Gee (née Charlotte O. Gee; 1886–1973), dancer and soprano, and Effie King, dancer and contralto (photo in New York Age, June 12, 1913, p. 6 ; subscription required). Effie King was the stage name of Anna Green (maiden; 1888–1944), who in 1907, married actor Frank Henry Wilson (1885–1956).

When Dabney's theater manager Hamilton died December 10, 1910, James H. Hudnell took over as manager. Dabney's Theater received competition when the Hiawatha Theater, running vaudeville, opened in October 1910. It was also located in the Cardozo neighborhood at 2006-2008 11th Street, N.W. That theater ran until May 1922.

In October 1911, the New York Age published an announcement that Dabney had purchased the Chelsea Theatre at 1913 M Street, N.W. (between 19th and 20th Streets, N.W.). Louis Mitchell and J. West were the house managers. One year earlier, around August 1910, S.L. Jones and L. Kohler Chambers (né Luddington Kohler Chambers; 1874–1913) acquired the Chelsea, which had been "formerly owned and managed by white people."

Two months later, around December 1, 1911, Dabney's Theater changed hands and James H. Hudnell became sole manager. He kept the name, "Dabney's Theater," but operated it as a motion-picture theater until January 1912, then added back vaudeville.

Career (continued) 
In 1909, Dabney began composing and publishing songs, namely "Oh! You Devil" (©1909), "That Minor Strain" (©1910), "Haytian Rag" (©1911), and "Shine" (©1910). Dabney began working with James Reese Europe at the Clef Club in the 1910s, and together collaborated with Florenz Ziegfeld on his shows in New York City (including at the New Amsterdam Theater from 1913 to 1921). Europe and Dabney's collaborations included eight pieces to accompany the dancing of Vernon and Irene Castle.

Dabney's Syncopated Orchestra 
In 1917, Ford Dabney's Syncopated Orchestra began recording jazz. In August 1917, during their first session, they recorded 5 songs for Aeolian Vocalion, including "At the Darkdown Strutter's Ball," which featured vocalist Arthur Fields.

Dabney and his instrumentalists were black and Fields was white. According to historian Tim Brooks, that recording was "an early, and unusual example of a white vocalist recording with a black orchestra. Though not the first example of interracial recording, it was progressive for its time." Dabney, from 1919 through 1922, as pianist and leader, recorded 28 songs with Vocalion and Paramount.

Ziegfeld's Midnight Frolic

Dabney, leading his own Syncopated Orchestra, was the musical director of Ziegfeld's Midnight Frolic for 8 years, from 1913 to 1921. The shows were in the Roof Garden Club of the New Amsterdam Theatre, where more risqué productions were presented. In that setting, his Syncopated Orchestra stands as the first black orchestra to play regularly in a Broadway Theater.

In the summers, Dabney's orchestra performed at the Palais Royale in Atlantic City.

Known members of Dabny's Orchestra 
 1917

 
 
 
 
 
 
 
 
 
 

 1922

 
 
 
 John Reeves, trombone

1917: death of Vernon Castle 
After the start of World War I, Vernon Castle – Dabney and Europe's employer – was determined to fight for England. He joined the Royal Flying Corps, trained as a pilot, but was killed in 1917 during flight training crash at Camp Taliaferro, near Fort Worth, Texas.

1919: death of James Reese Europe 
James Reese Europe served in World War I as a commissioned officer in the New York Army National Guard and fought as a lieutenant with the 369th Infantry Regiment (the "Harlem Hellfighters") when it was assigned to the French Army. Europe rapidly rose with great acclaim as director the 369 Regiment Band and returned to New York in 1919 as a war hero.

On May 9, 1919, Europe was performing in Boston at Mechanics Hall. During an intermission, he berated a snare drummer, Herbert B. Wright (born 1895), who became enraged and lunged at him, striking his neck with a pen knife in what seemed initially to be a minor nick. Even Europe dismissed it as a superficial wound. But, within a few hours it turned fatal. Wright was convicted of manslaughter and served 8 years of a 10-to-12-year sentence in the Massachusetts State Prison.

After Europe's death, Dabney continued leading his own ensembles, including Dabney's Band and Ford Dabney's Syncopated Orchestra, the latter of which recorded for Belvedere and Puritan Records. However, these endeavors were less successful, and in 1921 he lost his theater position on Broadway.

As a side note, when Wright was released on March 30, 1927, he, with his wife Lillie, went on to live in Roxbury, Boston, at 23 Haskins Street, working as an elevator operator, a danceband drummer, and a private drum teacher. Wright was the first music teacher for one particular 8-year-old Roy Haynes, who lived across the street at 30 Haskins.

Dabney's career (continued) and death 
After losing his job in 1921 at the New Amsterdam Theatre, Dabney continued working in New York, composing for three more decades. Notably, he scored all the music and co-wrote the lyrics for Rang Tang in 1927. His film credits include the 1934 film, Social Register, and the 1943 film, Stormy Weather (as consultant). Dabney operated an entertainment bureau, and for many years, performed engagements in West Palm Beach and Newport.

Dabney was close friends with the family of Associate Justice Thurgood Marshall and was an honorary pallbearer for the funeral of Marshall's first wife, Vivian Burey Marshall (1911–1955).

Dabney died June 6, 1958, in Manhattan, at the Sydenham Hospital –  after the death of W.C. Handy.

Works

Songs and rags 
<li> 
<li> 
<li> 

 From His Honor the Barber (1909)
<li> 
 The song debuted in S.H. Dudley's 1909 production of His Honor the Barber, with a notable production in 1911 at the Majestic Theater, currently the site of the Time Warner Center. Stars included Dudley and Aida Overton Walker (1880–1914), who sang "Shine."

 According to songwriter Perry Bradford, the song was inspired by a real person named 'Shine' (possibly 'Kid Shine'), a street tough kid who was a friend of George Walker, and who was caught with Walker in the New York City race riot of August 1900.

 David Krasner, in his 1995 article, "Parody and Double Consciousness in the Language of Early Black Musical Theatre," stated, "Not only do the lyrics echo themes in Paul Laurence Dunbar's 1895 poem 'We Wear the Mask,' the text signifies what Du Bois calls living a 'double life, with double thoughts, double duties, and double social ' The lyrics of 'Shine' draw our attention to the double consciousness of racial identity, and parody racism through inverting the position of the signifier. The signifier (Walker) inverts the signified (racial identification; i.e., names), subverting racist signification. 'Shine,' Richard Newman writes, 'is almost a song of social protest in its antiracism."

 In 1924, fourteen years after "That's Why They Call Me Shine" was published, Lew Brown shortened the title to "Shine" and changed the lyrics from a black man singing about himself to a shoe shine man who has a sunny outlook.

 Songs (continued)
<li> 
<li> 
<li> 

 From Ziegfeld Follies of 1910
<li> 
<li> 
<li> 
<li> 

 Castle compositions, co-composed with James Reese Europe, Joseph W. Stern (1870–1934), publisher

<li> 
 
 
 
 
<li> 
<li> 
 "Castles' Half and Half" (©1914), in quintuple meter –  
<li> 

 The syndicated cartoon, Strange as It Seems, by Elsie Hix (née Elsie Teresa Huber; 1902–1995), dated September 21, 1959, states that "The fox trot was born because Ford Dabney, the band leader, played "Down Home Rag" too slow! The new step was improvised by Vernon and Irene Castle because the tempo was too slow their brisk one-step "
 From Kern and Bolton's Nobody Home (1915)
 — Princess Theatre April 20, 2015, through June 1915; Maxine Elliott's Theatre June 7, 1915, through August 7, 1915
<li> "At That San Francisco Fair," lyrics by Schuyler Greene (né Schuyler Rawson Greene; 1880–1929), music by Dabney, Europe, and Jerome Kern; published by T. B. Harms & Francis, Day & Hunter, Inc. performed in Act 2, sang by the character Miss Tony Miller with Chorus; Miller was played by Adele Rowland and Zoe Barnett

 Songs (continued)

<li> 
<li> 
<li> 
<li> 
<li> 
<li> 
<li> 
<li>

Scores 
 The King's Quest (©1909)
 — Operetta: lyrics by J. Mord Allen (né Junius Mordecai Allen; 1875–1953), an African American poet, music by Dabney, which includes the song, "Oh! You Devil."

 Rang Tang'' (©1927; renewed 1954)
 — Musical revue: book by Kaj Gynt (1885–1956); lyrics by Joseph H. Trent; music by Dabney, who tailored some of it for Mae Barnes and Evelyn Preer; published by Leo Feist

 "Rang Tang," fox trot
 "Brown"
 "Come to Africa"
 "Ee Yah," hunting song
 "Everybody Shout"
<li> "Feelin' Kinda Good"
 "Harlem"
 "Jubilee in Monkeyland"
 "Jungle Rose"
 "King and Queen"
 "Pay Me"
 "Sammy and Topsy"
 "Sammy's Banjo"
 "Six Little Wives"
 "Some Day"
 "Sweet Evening Breeze"
 "Voodoo"
 "Zulu Fifth Avenue"

 Professional affiliations 
 In April 1910, Dabney and several professional colleagues – including James Reese Europe, William Tyers (fr) (1870–1924), and Joe Jordan – formed the Clef Club, a union and booking agency that elevated the working conditions for black musicians in New York City.
 Around 1910, Dabney formed several touring vaudeville groups, among which, he and violinist Willie Carroll (né William Thomas Carroll; 1881–1943) conceived and produced Dabney's Ginger Girls, who first performed at his theater in Washington, D.C., before going on the road. The Ginger girls were a duet: Lottie Gee (née Charlotte O. Gee; 1886–1973), dancer and soprano, and Effie King, dancer and contralto (photo in New York Age, June 12, 1913, p. 6; accessible via ; subscription required)
 Dabney, Europe, and others left the Clef Club and, in 1913, organized the Tempo Club (an African American talent bureau), which became a rival to the Clef Club. It was the Tempo Club that furnished an orchestra for the dance team of Irene and Vernon Castle.
 Dabney became a member of ASCAP in 1937
 Dabney was a member of the Negro Actors Guild of America

 Selected audio, discography, rollography, filmography, and choreography 
 As composer 

<li> "Anoma"
<li> Elliott Adams and Tom Brier
(audio via YouTube)

<li> "Enticement," composed by G. Noceti (pseudonym of Ford Dabney)
 Prince's Band, Columbia A-5620, Matrix 37065, recorded 1914

<li> "Castle Walk"
<li> Europe's Society Orchestra, Victor 17553-A, Matrix: B-14434, recorded February 10, 1914, New York
Dabney is pianist
(audio via YouTube)
<li> Black Manhattan, Vol. 2, The Paragon Ragtime Orchestra, Rick Benjamin, director, New World Records (2012): 
(audio via YouTube)

<li> "Georgia Grind"
<li> 
() courtesy Library of Congress

<li> "Castle Perfect Trot"
<li> Black Manhattan (Vol. 1 of 3) (2002); 
(audio via YouTube)

<li> "Oh! You Devil"
<li> Black Manhattan, Vol. 2 (2012): 
(audio via YouTube)

<li> Willie "The Lion" Smith, Reminiscing The Piano Greats, Dial 305, recorded January 29, 1950, Paris

<li> "Shine"
<li> Showarama Gypsy Jazz, Magnolia Entertainment NOLA
(instrumental only; audio via YouTube)

<li> 

<li> 
(audio via YouTube)
(audio via YouTube)

<li> 
Grammophon (F)K-7790, Matrix OLA1293-1, recorded October 15, 1936, Paris
(audio via YouTube)

<li> "Bugle Call Blues"
<li> 
(audio via YouTube)

 As band and orchestra leader 

<li> "I'm So Glad My Mamma Don't Know Where I'm At" (©1915), words and music by Willie Toosweet (né Willie Perry)
<li> 

<li> "Lassus Trombone" (©1915), one step (and trombone smear), by Henry Fillmore
<li> 
(audio via YouTube)

<li> "The Dancing Deacon" (©1919), by Frederick M. Bryan (1889–1929)
<li> Dabney's Band, Aeolian Vocalion , recorded September 1919, New York
(audio via YouTube)

<li> "Camp Meeting Blues," fox trot (©1920), by Willie Carroll (né William Thomas Carroll; 1881–1943)
<li> Dabney's Band, Aeolian Vocalion B12246, Matrix 2692, recorded November 1919, New York

<li> "Sweet Man O' Mine" (©1921), words and music by Roy Turk and J. Russel Robinson
<li> 
(audio via YouTube)

<li> "Doo Dah Blues" (©1922), Fred Rose & Eddie White (pseudonym of Ted Fio Rito)
<li> 
(audio via YouTube)

 Rollography 

<li> "Shine"
<li> Played by Lee Sims (1898–1966), United States Piano Roll Company, Roll 42089
(audio via YouTube)
<li> Played by Ferde Grofé (1892–1972) ("assisted"), Ampico 205001-E, "recording with words"

<li> "Anoma"
<li> Played by Lee Sims (1898–1966), Ampico Lexington 88n, recut of early US 88-note 
(audio via YouTube)

<li> "Oh! You Devil"
 Connorized 4496 (65 note)
 Connorized 1514
 Full Scale 12334
 QRS 03179 (65 note)
 QRS 30726
 Universal 77837 (65 note)
 Universal 92465
 U.S. Music 62270
<li> Virtuoso 5931 (65 note)

<li> "Oh You Angel"
 Full Scale 12334
<li> U.S. Music 74769

 Filmography 
"Shine"
 1931: A Rhapsody in Black and Blue – performed by Louis Armstrong and band
 1941: Birth of the Blues – sang by Bing Crosby
 1942: Casablanca – sang by Dooley Wilson as Sam accompanied by the band in the setting at Rick's Cafe
 
 1955: The Benny Goodman Story – performed on trumpet by Harry James
 1956: The Eddy Duchin Story – performed by Tyrone Power as Eddy Duchin and Rex Thompson as Peter Duchin with accompaniment
 1989: Satchmo: The Live of Louis Armstrong 1997: Wild Man Blues – documentary
 1999: Sweet and Lowdown"Honey Dear"
 1934: Social Register"The Castle Walk"
 1939: The Story of Vernon and Irene Castle Dance 
 1983: Low Down and Dirty Rag, Donald Byrd/Group II, choreographed by Donald Byrd, premiered in New York November 3, 1983, at the Dance Theater Workshop, was a new production set to piano arrangements of popular music by Dabney in a suite of three duets based on such period "animal" dances – the Grizzly Bear, the Turkey Trot, and the Chicken Glide – choreographed, according to Jennifer Dunning of The New York Times: 

 Chief collaborators 
As bandleader, songwriter, professional organization founder
 James Reese Europe (1880–1919)

As songwriter
 Joe Trent (né Joseph Hannibal Trent; 1892–1954), American lyricist; re: 1927 Broadway production of Rang Tang Cecil Mack (1873–1944); re: Shine Lew Brown (1893–1958)
 Tim Brymn (1874–1946)

As theater orchestra musical director
 Florenz Ziegfeld (1867–1932): Dabney collaborated with Florenz Ziegfeld in the 1915 production of Midnight Frolic. Dabney's legacy as a ragtime pianist 
In an effort to place Dabney as a ragtime pianist among peers, Elliott Shapiro (1895–1956), son of one of Dabney's publishers, Maurice Shapiro, in a 1951 article, offered a list of standout ragtime pianists — in two categories, (i) pioneers and (ii) later ragtimers. Shapiro included Dabney in the latter group.

 Family 
Parents
Ford Thompson Dabney was born to John Wesley (J.W.) Dabney (1851–1924) and Rebecca C. Ford (maiden; 1854–1896). J.W. and Rebecca had married November 13, 1879, in Alexandria, Virginia. J.W. was a musician and celebrated barber, who, according to the Washington Times in 1903, had cut hair for President McKinley and President Theodore Roosevelt. Beginning around 1889, J.W. Dabney was often referred to as Capt. J.W. Dabney, reflecting his rank in a Washington, D.C.-based milita, exclusively African-American, known as the Washington Cadet Corps, founded June 12, 1880 – which in 1887, was the first unit to become a permanent part of the then newly established District of Columbia National Guard, Fifth Battalion. Capt. Dabney, nonetheless, as a professional, was chronicled as an innovative and successful tonsorial artist. Ford's step-mother, Capt. Dabney's second wife (married December 21, 1898) – Gertrude V. Dabney (née Gertrude V. Adams; 1876–1961) – sold J.W. Dabney's tonic products.

J.W. Dabney's barber shop, in the latter 1880s, was at the Hamilton House Hotel, 14th and K Streets, N.W. (same site as the Hamilton Hotel erected in 1922 at the northwest corner of Franklin Square). On November 15, 1888, J.W. Dabney opened a barber shop at Welckers Hotel (see photo below), 721 15th Street, N.W., between New York Avenue and H Street, N.W.

Dabney's stepmother, Gertrude, in 1929, held the distinction of serving on the first all-women jury in Washington, D.C. She was the only non-white.

WifeDabney married – on March 14, 1912, in Washington – Martha D. Gans, widow of boxer Joe Gans who had owned the Goldfield Hotel in Baltimore at the corner of East Lexington and Colvin Streets, just east of downtown, in the Pleasant View Gardens neighborhood. Joe Gans – according to boxing historian and Ring Magazine founder Nat Fleischer – was the greatest lightweight boxer of all-time.

Ford and Martha had a son, Ford Thompson Dabney, Jr. (1917–1983), who became a certified public accountant.

Uncle and step-aunt: James H. and Ruby H. DabneyGertrude's sister (Ford Dabney's step-aunt), Ruby H. Dabney (née Ruby Adams; 1872–1901) (see photo below), was the second of three wives of one of Ford's uncles, James H. Dabney (1846–1923), a prominent and affluent Washington, D.C.-based undertaker and philanthropist. Ruby, in 1898, earned a professional degree from the Massachusetts College of Embalming, Boston – notable for being the first African American woman in the history of Washington, D.C., to earn a college diploma.

Uncle: Wendell Phillips DabneyDabney's uncle, Wendell Phillips Dabney (1965–1952), who is chronicled as having been one of his music teachers, became founding president of Cincinnati chapter of the NAACP, author, and newspaper editor and publisher of the Ohio Enterprise, later named The Union, both late of Cincinnati. During the early 1890s, Prof. Wendell Phillips Dabney was of the most notable musicians in Richmond, Virginia. He had studied attended music in 1883 at the Oberlin Conservatory of Music. Part of his influence on Ford Dabney, as his student, may be found in the 1914 composition, "Castle Valse Classique," humoreske, an adaptation by Dabney of Antonin Dvořák's Humoresque, Op. 101, No. 7 (of 8), Poco lento e grazioso in G major. Prof. Dabney, in 1895, contacted Dvořák, who was director the National Conservatory of Music of America, an institution in New York that, like Oberlin, accepted African Americans. At Dvořák's home, Prof. Dabney, among other things, introduced one of his own compositions, a plantation melody, "Uncle Remus."

Great uncle: John Marshall DabneyOne of Dabney's great uncles, John Marshall Dabney (1824–1900), was honored in November 2015 in Richmond, Virginia, at the Quirk Hotel, as a caterer and bartender – known as the world's greatest mint julep maker. The event was attended by notable community members and one of his great-great granddaughters, Jennifer Hardy (née Jennifer Dehaven Jackson). Jennifer's mother (great-granddaughter-in-law of John Marshall Dabney), Mary Hinkson (1925–2014), was an internationally celebrated modern dancer. His legacy was the subject of the a 23-minute documentary released in 2017, The Hail-Storm: John Dabney in Virginia, by Hannah Ayers and Lance Warren.

One of John Marshall Dabney's sons (Dabney's 1st cousin, once removed)John Milton Dabney (né'' Milton Williamson Dabney; 1867–1967) was a player in the Black baseball leagues. Alexander "Buck" Spottswood, as manager, and J. Milton Dabney as team captain, reorganized, in 1895, the Manhattan Baseball Club of Richmond, Virginia. J.M. Dabney also played for the Original Cuban Giants of St. Augustine, Florida, and Trenton, New Jersey – the first professional African-American baseball team.

Notes, copyrights, and references

Notes

Copyrights 

 
 Original copyrights
 

 Copyright renewals

Genealogical records

Encyclopedic / biographical 

<li>  by Eugene Chadbourne, AllMusic (retrieved April 20, 2015)
<li>  at Discogs (retrieved April 20, 2015)
<li> Biographical Dictionary of American Music, by Charles Eugene Claghorn (1911–2005), West Nyack: Parker Publishing Company, Inc. (1973), p. 113; ; 
<li> The Oxford Companion to Popular Music, by Peter Gammond (1925–2019), Oxford Companions, Oxford University Press (1991; 1993 reprint with corrections); 
<li> Biography Index, A cumulative index to biographical material in books and magazines, Vol. 14, September 1984 – August 1986, H.W. Wilson Co. (1986);  (online via Gale)
<li> Profiles of African American Stage Performers and Theatre People, 1816–1960, by Bernard L. Peterson, Jr., Greenwood Press (2001); 
<li> In Black and White, A guide to magazine articles, newspaper articles, and books concerning black individuals and groups (3rd ed.), Mary Mace Spradling (née Mary Elizabeth Mace; 1911–2009) (ed.)

Inline

Historic newspapers, magazines, and journals

External links

1883 births
1958 deaths
Ragtime pianists
Ragtime composers
American jazz bandleaders
Vaudeville performers
African-American songwriters
Songwriters from Washington, D.C.
American composers
African-American jazz composers
American jazz composers
Burials at Arlington National Cemetery
Musicians from Washington, D.C.
Entertainers from Washington, D.C.
20th-century African-American people